Sanxi, may refer to the following places:

Anhui
Sanxi, Jingde County

Chongqing
Sanxi, Dianjiang County

Guangdong
Sanxi, Lechang

Hubei
Sanxi, Yangxin County

Jiangxi
Sanxi Township, Nanfeng County

Shaanxi
Sanxi, Zhenba County

Sichuan
Sanxi, Jintang County
Sanxi, Wusheng County